Halford House is a Grade II listed building in Halford Road, in the centre of Richmond in the London Borough of Richmond upon Thames. Originally an 18th-century manor house with 19th-century additions, it was purchased by the Christian Fellowship in Richmond in 1954. It previously housed the Richmond School of Music.

The earliest parts of Halford House date from 1710. The rest was built in 1745, with additions in 1867 at the back of the house.

References

Further reading
 Lambert, Lance (2012). Let the House of God Be Built: The Story and Testimony of Halford House, 173pp, New Wine Press,

External links
Halford House – Christian Fellowship in Richmond official website
 

1710 establishments in England
Grade II listed buildings in the London Borough of Richmond upon Thames
Richmond, London